Keiron may refer to:

Keiron Bigby (born 1966), former American football wide receiver
Keiron Cunningham (born 1976), Welsh professional rugby league coach and former player
Keiron Jenkins (born 1987), Welsh rugby union player
Keiron O'Loughlin, English former professional rugby league footballer
Keiron Reardon (1900–1978), American politician in the state of Washington
Keiron Self (born 1971), Welsh actor and writer, played Roger Bailey, Jr. in the BBC sitcom My Family
Keiron Phelan & David Sheppard, musicians based in London, England

See also
Keiron: The First Voyager, 1995 Australian film about escapees from the planet earth
Kheiron
Keirin